William Godolphin may refer to:
 Sir William Godolphin (Warden of the Stannaries) (c. 1486 – c. 1570), English Member of Parliament (MP) and High Sheriff of Cornwall
 Sir William Godolphin (1515–1570), his son, with whom he has been confused by some authorities
 Sir William Godolphin (1547–1589), nephew of the previous, MP for Helston 1586-7
 Sir William Godolphin (1567–1613), MP for Cornwall
 William Godolphin (1611–1636), his son, a Governor of the Scilly Islands
 William Godolphin, Marquess of Blandford (1700–1731), English nobleman
 William Godolphin (Royalist) (1605–1663), who commanded a Royal regiment during the English Civil War and was MP for Helston 1640
 Sir William Godolphin, 1st Baronet (died 1710), MP for Helston 1665–1679
 Sir William Godolphin (diplomat) (1635–1696), English ambassador to Spain, MP for Camelford